The 2019 Port Vila FA Cup or the 2019 PVFA Cup for short, is the national cup in the country of Vanuatu, held for association football clubs competing in the Port Vila Football League (from 3 division). It is ran and overseen by the Port Vila Football Association. 

It's originally a tournament held as a pre-season competition for the 8 teams that play in the Digicel Premier League. This season we had three cups, one for each division of Port Vila FA.

Premier League Opening Cup

Teams
The eight teams in the cup are the teams that will play the 2019-20 Port Vila Premier League
ABM Galaxy
Erakor Golden Star
Ifira Black Bird
Mauwia
Sia-Raga
Tafea
Tupuji Imere
Yatel

Group stage

Group A

Group B

Semi-final

Third-place match

Final

First Division Opening Cup
The eight teams in the cup are the teams that will play the 2019-20 Port Vila First Division

Teams
Shepherds United
Mauriki
United Malampa
Easton
AS Ambassadors
North Efate United
Pango Green Bird
Seveners United

Final

The final was played on 10 September in Korman Stadium

Second Division Opening Cup
The eight teams in the cup are the teams that will play the 2019-20 Port Vila Second Division

Teams
Kings United
Van Warriors
Melakel
Black Diamond
Narak Tegapu
Redal
Teouma Academy
Varona

Group B 
Black Diamond
Kings United
Narak Tegapu
Varona

Final

The final was played on 7 September 2019 at Korman Stadium. Narak Tegapu has beaten Redal in the final match.

See also

Port Vila Shield
Port Vila Independence Cup
VFF National Super League
Sport in Vanuatu

References 

Vanuatu PVFA Cup
PVFA Cup